Daniel Boucher is a politician in Montreal, Quebec, Canada. He served on the Montreal city council from 1994 to 1998, originally as a member of Vision Montreal and later as an independent. Boucher has also sought election to the House of Commons of Canada and the National Assembly of Quebec.

Early life and career
Boucher was a bus driver for a seniors' residence in the early 1990s. A Quebec sovereigntist, he was an early supporter of the Bloc Québécois in Canadian federal politics.

Early bids for public office
While supporting the Bloc Québécois at the federal level, Boucher ran as a New Democratic Party of Quebec (NDP) candidate for a 1992 provincial by-election in the Montreal division of Anjou. (Former Front de libération du Québec militant Paul Rose had planned to seek the party's nomination for this contest, but could not do so as he was on parole from a life sentence for the murder of Quebec politician Pierre Laporte.) The Quebec NDP was not affiliated with the New Democratic Party of Canada in this period, and the federal party openly dissociated itself from the Quebec NDP during the by-election. Boucher finished a distant third against Parti Québécois candidate Pierre Bélanger.

Boucher later ran as a Bloc Québécois candidate in the 1993 Canadian federal election for the Montreal division of Papineau—Saint-Michel. Some pundits believed he had a reasonable chance of winning, though on election day he finished second against Liberal incumbent André Ouellet. Boucher was thirty-six years old during this election and identified as a social worker.

Municipal politician
Boucher was elected to the Montreal city council in the 1994 municipal election as a candidate of Pierre Bourque's Vision Montreal party, defeating Montreal Citizens' Movement incumbent Micheline Daigle in the Jean-Rivard division. He served for the next two years as a backbench supporter of Bourque's administration and chaired the city's finance and economic development committee. In 1996, he shelved a proposal to charge full taxes on churches and religious institutions, arguing that he would wait for the provincial government's direction on the issue.

In an interview published by the Montreal Gazette on June 15, 1996, Boucher said that several members of Vision Montreal had concerns about the party's internal management and believed too much power was invested in the mayor and the Montreal executive committee. He added that he was not planning to resign from the party and that Bourque had been receptive to his criticism. Only ten days later, however, he and fellow councillor Hubert Deraspe left the party to sit as independents. In making this decision, Boucher remarked that "all the qualified people [had] left Vision Montreal" and that it was "a party in name only."

Boucher and Deraspe later accused Bourque of trying to buy the support of disgruntled councillors by introducing a council pay increase, and, when allegations surfaced about illegal fundraising by Vision Montreal, they sought to persuade Vision councillors to defect to the opposition. In January 1998, Boucher introduced a motion of censure against Bourque and executive committee chair Noushig Eloyan.

Also in January 1998, Boucher joined an informal opposition alliance called the Coalition for Montreal's Future, led by fellow ex-Vision councillor Sammy Forcillo. Boucher served as the group's critic for municipal services, with a focus on sports and leisure.

Boucher ran as an independent candidate in the 1998 municipal election and lost to Vision Montreal's Nicole Roy-Arcelin. He attempted to return to council in the 2001 election as a candidate of Gérald Tremblay's Montreal Island Citizens' Union, but lost to Vision candidate Frank Venneri.

Electoral record

References

Living people
Montreal city councillors
Bloc Québécois candidates for the Canadian House of Commons
Candidates in the 1993 Canadian federal election
Year of birth missing (living people)